Alopecosa kovblyuki is a wolf spider species found in Russia and Ukraine.

See also
List of Lycosidae species

References

kovblyuki
Spiders of Europe
Spiders of Russia
Spiders described in 2012